Juan Ignacio "Fufi" Cáceres Stuart (born 1 May 1984) is a Uruguayan former racing driver from Punta del Este.

He had a Formula One test with Minardi in 2005 and one-race appearance in Champ Car World Series with Dale Coyne Racing. Cáceres later raced in the TC2000 touring car series in Argentina.

Racing career 
Cáceres started his career in go-karting in 1995, competing in the Cadetes division of the Uruguayan Karting Championship. In 1996, he won the Copa Mercosur and Campeonato de Verano titles, and finished third in the Uruguayan Karting Championship. The following year, he moved to the 125 cc Pre-Junior category, finishing fifth in 1997 and fourth in 1998. The same year, he enrolled at José Valentin Bianchi's RAC driver academy, in Buenos Aires, Argentina. Cáceres remained in Argentina in 1999, competing in the Fórmula Honda, but did not win a single race.

Move to Europe and North America 
In 2000, he competed in the United States-based Skip Barber Formula Dodge Midwestern Regional Championship, where he won one race at Road America. Cáceres began racing in Europe in 2001. He participated in Italian Formula Renault for ADM Junior Team and in the Argentine Formula Super Renault, without much success. He competed in Argentina for a second season in 2002.

In 2003, Cáceres won the Formula BMW Junior Cup, with four wins in six races. He also took part in the British Zip Formula championship. In the same year, Cáceres drove a Benetton B201 at a test session at the Circuit de Catalunya, his first experience driving a Formula One car. He was signed by Giancarlo Minardi to be part of his driver academy.

The 2004 season saw Cáceres progress to the higher-tier Spanish Formula Three. Driving a Dallara F300-Toyota car, he finished 14th in the Drivers' Championship with 10 points. His best result was a sixth-place finish at Estoril.

Going into 2005, Cáceres moved to the Italian Formula 3000 Championship driving a Lola B99/50 chassis for GP Racing. He took one podium, a third-place finish at Brno, for fifth position in the championship, scoring 20 points. Giancarlo Minardi stated that the Uruguayan driver had a lot of potential and his F3000 performances were "very good."

Formula One testing 
Cáceres tested for Minardi in a PS05 car at Vallelunga in November 2005. He drove a total 32 laps with the, topping the table with a lap time of 1:21.019.

For 2006, Cáceres remained in the Italian Formula 3000, now renamed Euroseries 3000. He took two second-place finishes at Spa and Silverstone for 7th in the Drivers' Championship. In September 2006, he tested for Dale Coyne Racing at Sebring. He took part in a single round of the 2006 Champ Car season, replacing Mario Domínguez in the Grand Prix of Road America, where he qualified and finished last.

Complete Champ Car results
(key)

References

External links
Juan Cáceres - driver's official website
Champ Car - biography and statistics

1984 births
Living people
Champ Car drivers
Auto GP drivers
Italian Formula Renault 2.0 drivers
People from Punta del Este
Euroformula Open Championship drivers
TC 2000 Championship drivers
Uruguayan racing drivers
Uruguayan people of Spanish descent
Piquet GP drivers
Dale Coyne Racing drivers